The In Sound from Way Out! is an instrumental compilation by the Beastie Boys, released in 1996. The title and cover art concept were borrowed from the Perrey and Kingsley album of the same name.

Track listing

CD version

Notes
Tracks 1, 3, 4, 6, and 10 are from Check Your Head (tracks 3 and 10 are alternate mixes without any vocals; track 1 has an edited intro)
Track 5 is from the "Sure Shot" single
Tracks 2, 7, 8, 9, 11, and 12,  are from Ill Communication (track 8 is an alternate mix; track 9 contains a shorter intro)
Track 13 is from the "Jimmy James" single

Special Edition Double Vinyl

Certifications

References

1996 compilation albums
Capitol Records compilation albums
Instrumental rock compilation albums
Beastie Boys compilation albums
Jazz-funk compilation albums
Albums produced by Mario Caldato Jr.